Chuck Washington is an American politician from California. Since 2015, he serves on the Riverside County Board of Supervisors in Riverside County, California.

Election history

2020 Riverside County Board of Supervisors, District 3 

{{Election box open primary general election no party no change}

2016 Riverside County Board of Supervisors, District 3

References

California local politicians
Year of birth missing (living people)